Fergus G. Malone (August, 1844 – January 1, 1905) was a professional baseball player in the 1860s and 1870s. He was the catcher for the Philadelphia Athletics in 1871, champion of the first professional league season.

Born 1842 in County Tyrone (today part of Northern Ireland), Malone was one of four Irish natives to play in the first National Association season and one of five in the first National League season. If the NA is disregarded as a major league, he and Andy Leonard share distinction as the first major leaguers born in Ireland, their teams having met in the first NL game, 22 April 1876 (Leonard is first overall taking the NA into account).

Although a left-handed thrower, Malone was mainly a catcher with major teams, both amateur and pro. Physically it was a demanding position, no one using a face mask or regularly using a glove. (Doug Allison used buckskin mittens in 1870, but gloves and masks were only adopted for regular use by some catchers beginning in the late 1870s.)

Malone was the primary catcher for the Philadelphia Athletics 1871–72, Philadelphia White Stockings 1873, and Chicago White Stockings 1874. In 1873–74, he was team captain, earning manager's credit today. He returned to the Philadelphia Whites and played in eight games in 1875, then returned to the Philadelphia Athletics for the inaugural National League season, catching 20 of 60 games.

Malone was the highest paid player in professional baseball in 1874 with an annual salary of $2,800.

Fergy Malone was 34 when the Athletics were expelled from the National League, which contracted from eight to six for 1877. He returned to the majors with the one-year Union Association in 1884, managing its Philadelphia entry and playing in one game.  In 220 major league games Fergy Malone batted .274 with one home run, 157 runs batted in, and 200 runs scored.  He was a player-manager for his teams in 1873, 1874, and 1884, recording a total of 47 wins and 66 losses.

Malone died 1905 in Seattle, Washington at the age of 60. He is buried at New Cathedral Cemetery in Philadelphia.

The Society for American Baseball Research list Malone as a Civil War veteran, having enlisted in a 100 days’ regiment on July 15, 1864, and serving with Dick McBride as a private and corporal in Company A, 196th Pennsylvania.

See also
List of Major League Baseball player–managers

References

Wright, Marshall (2000). The National Association of Base Ball Players, 1857–1870. Jefferson, North Carolina: McFarland & Co.

External links

Retrosheet. "Fergy Malone".

19th-century Irish people
Major League Baseball catchers
Major League Baseball player-managers
Philadelphia Keystones (NABBP) players
Washington Olympics (NABBP) players
Philadelphia Athletics (NABBP) players
Philadelphia Athletics (NA) players
Philadelphia White Stockings players
Philadelphia White Stockings managers
Chicago White Stockings players
Philadelphia Athletics (NL) players
Philadelphia Keystones players
Major League Baseball first basemen
Irish emigrants to the United States (before 1923)
Major League Baseball players from Ireland
Irish baseball players
19th-century baseball players
1842 births
1905 deaths
Minor league baseball managers
Philadelphia (minor league baseball) players
San Francisco Californias players
Holyoke (minor league baseball) players
Sportspeople from County Tyrone